Verdel may refer to:

 Al Verdel (1921-1991), American baseball player
 Verdel, Nebraska, United States